Choi Soo-jin is a South Korean voice actress who joined the Munhwa Broadcasting Corporation's Voice Acting Division in 1997.

Roles

Broadcast TV
Hwaje Jipjoong (Narration, MBC)
History 50 (Radio drama, MBC)
The Third Hospital (Television drama, tvN, cameo appearance episode 6)

Movie dubbing
GoldenEye (replacing Izabella Scorupco, Korea TV Edition, MBC) 
I Still Know What You Did Last Summer (replacing Jennifer Love Hewitt, Korea TV Edition, MBC)
Sahara (replacing Brooke Shields, Korea TV Edition, MBC) 
Seven (replacing Gwyneth Paltrow, Korea TV Edition, MBC) 
Heartbreakers (replacing Jennifer Love Hewitt, Korea TV Edition, MBC)

Theater

2009: Jack the Ripper
2010: Goong
2010: Jack the Ripper
2011: The Wizard of Oz
2011: Winter Sonata
2012: Propose
2012: The Celestial Watch
2012: Finding Mr. Destiny
2013: Zanna, Don't!
2013-2014: Le Passe-Muraille
2014: Singin' in the Rain
2015: All Shook Up
2015: Through the Door
2015: Gloomy Day
2016: Newsies

References

Living people
South Korean voice actresses
Year of birth missing (living people)